The neofiti were a group of Italian anusim, also known as crypto-Jews, living in Southern Italy.

History

The neofiti were descendants of Jews who were forced to convert to Roman Catholicism in 1493. They continued to secretly practice certain elements of Judaism, as did many of their descendants.

In the 1490s the Spanish Inquisition ruthlessly hunted the neofiti and many were tortured and executed, especially in Sicily.

Today, some descendants of neofiti in Calabria and Apulia have converted back to Judaism and revived their former Jewish congregations.

See also
 Dönmeh
 Allahdad
 Chala
 Converso
 Marrano
 Targum Neofiti
 History of the Jews in Apulia
 History of the Jews in Calabria
 History of the Jews in Sicily

References

External links
 terminiimerese.wordpress.com
 escholarship.org

Jewish Italian history
Italian people of Jewish descent
Crypto-Jews